Mt. Sinai Baptist Church may refer to:
Mt. Sinai Baptist Church (Eden, North Carolina)
Mt. Sinai Baptist Church (Suffolk, Virginia)